Hulsmans is a surname. Notable people with the surname include:

Jules Hulsmans (1898–?), Belgian modern pentathlete
Kevin Hulsmans (born 1978), Belgian cyclist

See also
Hulsman